Perajurit Tanah Air or Inilah Barisan Kita is a patriotic Malaysian song composed by Saiful Bahari. The song extols soldiers' readiness to fight and die.

Perajurit Tanah Air found renewed popularity among Malaysians in the wake of the 2013 Lahad Datu standoff and the COVID-19 pandemic as a song dedicated to the frontliners. It is also sung by the supporters of the Malaysian national football team.

Lyrics

See also 
 Negaraku (National anthem)

External links 
Perajurit mp3

Malaysian patriotic songs
Malaysian culture
Malay-language songs
Egalitarianism